Doron Swade MBE is a museum curator and author, specialising in the history of computing. He is especially known for his work on the computer pioneer Charles Babbage and his Difference Engine.

Swade was originally from South Africa. He has studied electronics engineering, history, machine intelligence, philosophy of science and physics at a number of universities including the University of Cape Town, University of Cambridge, and University College London (UCL). He holds a BSc in physics and electronics engineering, an MSc in control engineering, and a PhD in the history of computing from UCL.

He has been a curator at the Science Museum in London, England, and the Computer History Museum in Silicon Valley, California, United States. At the Science Museum, he curated the computing and electronics collections and rose to be Assistant Director and Head of Collections. His major project at the museum was to organise the construction of Charles Babbage's Difference Engine, in collaboration with Dr Allan Bromley who studied Babbage's original drawings at the Science Museum.

In 1989, Swade was a co-founder of the Computer Conservation Society, a specialist group of the British Computer Society (BCS), with regular meetings at the Science Museum. He is a Fellow of the BCS and a Chartered Engineer.

Swade is a Visiting Professor in the History of Computing at the University of Portsmouth, UK. He is also an Honorary Research Fellow in Computer Science at Royal Holloway, University of London.

He appeared in the In Our Time program on Ada Lovelace, a collaborator with Charles Babbage, broadcast on BBC Radio 4 in 2008.

Swade was awarded an MBE for services to the   history of computing in the UK New Year Honours 2009 list.

Since 2010, Swade has been involved with the Plan 28 project to understand whether Babbage's Analytical Engine was a feasible computer based on Babbage's work, and to build a simulation.

Bibliography
Swade has written the following books:

 The Dream Machine: Exploring the Computer Age, 1991. BBC Books, 1993. With Jon Palfreman. .
 Charles Babbage and his Calculating Engines, Science Museum, London, 1998. .
 The Cogwheel Brain, Abacus, 2001. .
 The Difference Engine: Charles Babbage and the Quest to Build the First Computer, Penguin Putnam, 2001. . Penguin Books, 2002. .
 The History of Computing: A Very Short Introduction, Oxford University Press, 2022. .

References

External links
 Charles Babbage Expert Doron Swade on Simplicity, YouTube
 Authors@Google: Doron Swade, YouTube

Year of birth missing (living people)
Living people
University of Cape Town alumni
Alumni of University College London
Alumni of the University of Cambridge
Academics of the University of Portsmouth
Academics of Royal Holloway, University of London
People associated with the Science Museum, London
British curators
American curators
Historians of science
Historians of technology
20th-century South African historians
Fellows of the British Computer Society
Members of the Order of the British Empire
21st-century English historians